Onomarchus is a genus of bush crickets or katydids found mainly distributed in the tropical forests of Asia. Like many other members of the subfamily Pseudophyllinae, their wings appear very leaf-like.

A study of O. uninotatus found it to produce sounds at an unusually low frequency of about 3.5 kHz. The tympanal membrane cuts out high frequencies unlike the sound filters found in other Tettigoniids.

Species
The species in the genus include 
 Onomarchus bisulcatus Ingrisch & Shishodia, 1998
 Onomarchus cretaceus (Serville, 1838)
 Onomarchus leuconotus (Serville, 1838) - type species (locality Java)
 Onomarchus philippinensis Weidner, 1965
 Onomarchus uninotatus (Serville, 1838)

References

External links
 

Tettigoniidae genera
Taxa named by Carl Stål
Pseudophyllinae